Robert Chazal (3 September 1912 – 12 April 2002), was a French film critique. He was chief editor of the magazine Cinémonde, and worked also for Paris-Presse,  France-Soir and Le Journal du Dimanche. He was a member of the jury at the 1981 Cannes Film Festival.

Theatre (co adaptator) 
 1994: La Nuit du crime after Steve Passeur, adaptation Jean Serge, Robert Chazal and Robert Hossein, Théâtre de Paris

Publications 
 Louis de Funès, Paris, Éditions Denoël, collection Étoiles, 1972

External links
 Notice biographique sur who'swho.fr accessdate 7 April 2016.

References

1912 births
2002 deaths
French film critics
French magazine editors